KCT Tech Park is an information technology (IT) technology park situated in Coimbatore, India. It is a unit of Ramanandha Adigalar Foundation and is operational since 2008, in 4.18 acres of land with 2.5 Lakh Sq ft of built up area. Software technology Parks of India IT Park is housed at KCT Campus building with 1.5 Lakh Sq ft of built up area. KCT Tech Park is located at Kumaraguru College of Technology (KCT) with a campus area over 150 acres of land.

The project
The project is located in Saravanampatti, quite practically the IT Corridor of the city with the region housing a large share of IT businesses at Coimbatore, 12 km from Coimbatore International Airport. KCT Tech Park is built to international standards, using post-tension construction technology. A range of features and facilities for software development companies, BPOs and corporate offices. KCT Tech Park offers a unique confluence of advantages, not found elsewhere in comparable destinations in Coimbatore - robust and failsafe physical infrastructure, power & data connectivity and highly trained technical manpower. It offers a well planned and sensitive working environment.

Occupants
Several reputed organizations are already operating from KCT Tech Park, which includes,

Ford Business Services 
State Street HCL Services
Altran
Cognizant Technology Solutions
ThoughtWorks
Forge Accelerator
Vanenburge Software India Pvt Ltd 
Sakthi financial services
Ultramain Systems Pvt Ltd
 Cresc Datasoft Pvt Ltd

References

Software technology parks in India
Economy of Coimbatore